The Malaysian Prison Department, is a department controlled by the Malaysian Minister of Home Affairs responsible for prisons where offenders sentenced by the courts are held. These jails also act as detention and recovery institutions.

The department is headquartered in the Malaysia Prison Complex (Kompleks Penjara Kajang) in Kajang, Selangor in the Klang Valley.

History

During the era of British rule and until the arrival of the Japanese in 1942, penal institutions were the responsibility of the individual states' governments with their respective regulations. In the Straits Settlements, a Superintendent based in Singapore, acted as the supervisor and inspected the institutions under his jurisdiction.

The Straits Settlements were the earliest to build their own prisons while the Federated Malay States did so only after the British set up a responsible department. The Taiping Prison, better known as the Taiping Gaol, the largest at the time, was built in 1879. Prisons were built with the main purpose of bringing suffering to the inmates in the hope that this would deter people from committing crimes.

In 1881, Sikh warders were brought in to assist Malay warders while vocational instructors from Hong Kong were used in an effort to introduce trades to the prisons. Among the earliest of these were rock breaking and carpentry. An attempt was made to categorise the inmates in 1882, then in 1889 European warders were appointed at some prisons.

With the formation of the Federated Malay States, Taiping Prison became a detention centre for long-term prisoners from Perak, Pahang, Negeri Sembilan and Selangor. In 1923, a visiting justice system was introduced and prison industries expanded to include printing work, weaving, sewing, rattan weaving, and metalwork. Rock-breaking work was abolished in 1924 and replaced with the pounding of coconut husks.

During the Japanese occupation (1941–1945), the Imperial Japanese Army also used the prisons for POWs. All records of the prisons and its inmates for this period were subsequently destroyed by the Japanese.

After World War II, the Prison Office was established to administer all prisons in Malaya. The post-war era saw the return of peace, and modern administrative methods were introduced. The 1948 Malayan Emergency resulted in an increase in inmate numbers, which in turn caused overcrowding in the prisons. This disrupted the development of the prison system and it was only towards the end of 1949 when peace returned that prison development could be carried out smoothly.

The Prisons Ordinance 1952 and the Prisons Regulations 1953, based on the "modern treatment" concept, were introduced to replace old legislation. In 1953, the Criminal Justice Bill was passed, which abolished use of the cat-o'-nine-tails and replaced the term "penal servitude" with "prison".

Following Independence Day in 1957, the first Prisons Commissioner was appointed to take charge of the administration of all prisons in Malaya. In 1963, with the formation of Malaysia, prisons in Sabah and Sarawak came under the jurisdiction of the Prisons Department.

On 2 November 1995, the Prison Act 1995 was introduced to replace the former Prison Act which in turn was superseded on 1 September 2000 by the Prison Regulations 2000. The previous acts and regulations had been in use for a long time, thus changes and reforms were necessary to meet current needs and demands to streamline prison management and administration.

In an era of development and modernisation, the Malaysian Prison Department realises that it should not to be content with its past achievements, but should instead move forward and innovate in order to assist the prison administration in dealing with modern culture through criminology, penology and overall social control.

Insignia

 The fourteen-point star represents the 13 States and the Federal Government of Malaysia, while the star and the crescent symbolise Islam, the official religion of Malaysia.
 The crossed keys symbolise the authority and responsibility delegated by the department in the performance of its duties.
 The paddy flower symbolises solidarity and close co-operation by multiracial staff at various levels in the hierarchy.
 The green background, the official colour of the Prisons Department, signifies allegiance to the Malaysian leader.

Motto
Source:
Cheerful, Sincere and Dedicated
Shall faithfully carry out departmental duties to uphold the national criminal legal system and shoulder the task of rehabilitation of offenders entrusted upon the department by the nation with full responsibility and dedication.

Green colour
Symbolises the objective of the department to reform citizens who have lapsed into moral decay and turn them into productive individuals who are once again able to fit into society as useful citizens able to fulfill their social obligations.

Sketch Heart and Hand
Symbolises the commitment by society to re-accommodate ex-convicts into social institutions without any kind of prejudice which may jeopardise their rehabilitation programme.

Silver background
Symbolises the sincerity of the departments management system in generating commitment and co-operation among society at large, offender families and the department to ensure the success of rehabilitation programmes.

Prison department organisational structure

Prison heads

List of Commissioners General

List of Deputy Commissioners General

Institutions

Headquarters
 Malaysian Prison Headquarters, Kajang
 Sarawak Prison Headquarters, Kuching
 Sabah Prison Headquarters, Kota Kinabalu

Prison
Kedah
 Pokok Sena Prison
 Sungai Petani Prison
 Alor Star Prison 
Penang
 Penang Prison
 Seberang Prai Prison
Perak
 Taiping Prison
 Tapah Prison
Selangor
 Sungai Buloh Prison
 Kajang Prison
 Kajang Women's Prison
Negeri Sembilan
 Jelebu Prison
 Seremban Prison
Melaka
 Ayer Keroh Prison
 Sg. Udang Prison
 Banda Hilir Prison 
Johor
 Simpang Renggam Prison 
 Kluang Prison 
Pahang
 Bentong Prison
 Penor Prison
Terengganu
 Marang Prison 
Kelantan
 Pengkalan Chepa Prison  
Sarawak
 Puncak Borneo Prison
 Sibu Prison 
 Miri Prison 
 Bintulu Prison 
 Sri Aman Prison 
 Limbang Prison 
Sabah
 Kota Kinabalu Prison
 Kota Kinabalu Women's Prison
 Tawau Prison 
 Sandakan Prison

Correctional Centre
 Perlis Correctional Centre

Juvenile School

Henry Gurney School, Telok Mas, Malacca (boys & girls)
Henry Gurney School, Kota Kinabalu, Sabah (all-girls)
Henry Gurney School, Keningau, Sabah (all-boys)
Henry Gurney School, Puncak Borneo, Sarawak (all-boys)
Henry Gurney School, Batu Gajah, Perak

Defunct Prison and Headquarters

 Malaysian Prison Headquarters, Taiping, Perak
 Pudu Prison, Kuala Lumpur (1895–1996)
 Johor Bahru Prison, Johor (1882–2005)
 Kuala Lipis Prison, Kuala Lipis, Pahang
 Kuantan Prison, Kuantan, Pahang
 Pulau Jerejak Prison, Penang
 Sim Sim Prison, Sandakan, Sabah (1850–1981)

Weaponry and equipment
Malaysian Prison Department operators are equipped with multi-specialized weaponry and marine assault vehicles, including:

Major cases and incidents

1981 Botak Chin

1986 Pudu Prison siege

Famous inmates

 Botak Chin

 Kevin Barlow and Brian Chambers
 Mona Fandey
 Datuk Seri Najib Razak

Malaysian Prison Department in popular culture

Television
 Patahnya Sebelah Sayap (Break Half Wing) – Malay drama created by Ayie Mustafa
 Disebalik Tirai Besi (Behind The Bar) – Malay drama produced by MDAG Marketing Sdn Bhd

References

External links

 Websites of Malaysian Prison Department
 Websites of Malaysian Prison Department 

Malaysia
Law enforcement in Malaysia
1790 establishments in British Malaya
Government agencies established in 1790
Ministry of Home Affairs (Malaysia)